

 
Ranken is a locality in the Northern Territory of Australia located in the territory's east adjoining the border with the state of Queensland  about  south-east of the territory capital of Darwin.

The locality consists of the following land (from west to east, then north to south):
The West Ranken pastoral lease
The East Ranken and Soudan pastoral leases
The Adder, Avon Downs and Burramurra pastoral leases. and 
The Rocklands and Austral Downs pastoral leases.

The locality’s boundaries and name were gazetted on 4 April 2007.  Its name is derived from the Ranken River which was named in the 1860s after John LC Ranken, the pastoralist who first established Lorne Creek, which is now known as the Avon Downs Station.

Ranken includes the following places listed on the Northern Territory Heritage Register – Avon Downs Pastoral Station, the Eldo Rocket Shelter Austral Downs and the Eldo Rocket Shelters Argadargada.

The 2016 Australian census which was conducted in August 2016 reports that Ranken had a population of 44 people.

Ranken is located within the federal division of Lingiari, the territory electoral division of Barkly and the local government area of the Barkly Region.

References

Populated places in the Northern Territory
Barkly Region